The 1970–71 Yugoslav First League season was the 25th season of the First Federal League, the top level association football league of SFR Yugoslavia, since its establishment in 1946. Eighteen teams contested the competition, which ended with Hajduk Split winning their fourth title, club's first in 16 years.

Events and incidents

Week 7: Hajduk v. OFK Beograd abandoned match and subsequent street riots in Split
The week 7 Hajduk vs. OFK Beograd league fixture at Split's Stari plac Stadium on 23 September 1970 was stopped and ultimately abandoned over an incident caused by Hajduk's fans. With the score tied at 2-2 in the 52nd minute, match referee Pavle Ristić from Novi Sad fell unconscious after getting hit in the head with an object thrown from the stands. As a result, the match was immediately stopped and abandoned. A few days later, the Yugoslav FA's (FSJ) disciplinary body made a ruling to register the contest by awarding a 0-3 win to the visiting OFK Beograd.

On the streets of Split, the disciplinary measure set off huge, days-long, often violent protests that quickly assumed a distinctly anti-Belgrade and anti-Serb tone. Led by the club's ultra fan group, Torcida, the practice of seeking out parked cars with the city of Belgrade license plates and pushing them into the Adriatic Sea off the docks was especially widespread in Split during the protests. The press also reported about some of the gathered mob spontaneously launching into a cynical and sarcastic rendition of Sergio Endrigo's then current and popular song "Kud plovi ovaj brod" ('Where is This Ship Going') as the cars with Belgrade plates were pushed into the sea and floated in the water before sinking.

Due to the undertones of ethnic hatred and potential to undermine the country's official inter-ethnic guiding principle during the politically sensitive time when MASPOK was gathering steam in SR Croatia, the Split football protests quickly came to the attention of Yugoslav federal authorities that decided to deal with the situation by pressing FSJ into changing its disciplinary ruling and registering the original 2-2 score. FSJ did exactly that, reinstating the score at the moment when the match was abandoned as the official result.

League table

Results

Winning squad
HAJDUK SPLIT (coach Slavko Luštica)

Top scorers

See also
1970–71 Yugoslav Cup
Football Association of Yugoslavia

References

External links
Yugoslavia Domestic Football Full Tables

Yugoslav First League seasons
Yugo
1970–71 in Yugoslav football